Books Unbanned is a United States library program that issues library cards that give electronic access to the library's digital and audio collections. Run by the Brooklyn Public Library, it was initiated in reaction to a wave of book challenges against schools and libraries in 2021.

History 
Efforts to censor teenage access to books in the United States swelled in 2021 after a video of a parent at a Fairfax County School Board meeting demanding removal of the graphic novel Gender Queer from the high school library went viral. Afterward, libraries and classrooms across the US became targets of coordinated campaigns frequently led or funded by right-wing activists.

In April 2022, the BPL introduced the Books Unbanned project in response to the movement, offering free Brooklyn Public Library ecards to teens and young adults aged 13 to 21 anywhere in the US. Teens apply to get an ecard through email or the library-run Instagram account. By January 2023, 6,000 teenagers had requested cards through the Books Unbanned program and 52,000 books had been checked out.

Impact 
In August 2022, a teacher in Oklahoma was put on administrative leave after posting the QR code for Books Unbanned in her classroom. The Oklahoma Secretary of Education called to have her teaching license revoked. The teacher subsequently resigned and, several months later, accepted a job with the Brooklyn Public Library.

Awards 
In 2023 the Books Unbanned team was recognized as Librarians of the Year by Library Journal.

References

External links 
Books Unbanned, Brooklyn Public Library

Book censorship in the United States
Brooklyn Public Library